DYSL (1170 AM & 104.7 FM) Radyo Pilipinas is a radio station owned and operated by Philippine Broadcasting Service. The station's studio is located inside the Southern Leyte State University campus, Concepcion St., Brgy. San Roque, Sogod, Southern Leyte.

References

Radio stations established in 1982
Philippine Broadcasting Service
Radio stations in Southern Leyte